HollyBlood is a 2022 Spanish teen romantic comedy with horror and parodical elements directed by Jesús Font which stars Óscar Casas and Isa Montalbán alongside Jordi Sánchez, Piero Méndez and Carlos Suárez, among others.

Plot 
The plot follows Javi, an unremarkable high school student infatuated with classmate Sara, fangirling in turn on a vampire book series. Upon a series of misunderstandings, Sara ends up believing Javi to be a vampire, while the threat of an actual vampire looms in.

Cast

Production 
HollyBlood was produced by La Canica Films, Quexito Films, SUICA Films and Amigos y Colmillos AIE, with the participation of RTVE and Netflix. It was shot in the Valencia region, including locations such as Valencia, Carcaixent and Sueca.

Release 
Selected as a pre-screening for the 'Antonio Ferrandis' Paterna Film Festival, the film screened at the Cines Kinepolis on 12 July 2022. Distributed by Filmax, the film was theatrically released on 22 July 2022 in Spain. Netflix set a 7 September 2022 streaming release date.

Reception 
Sergio F. Pinilla of Cinemanía rated the "unexpectedly fun" vampire romantic comedy 3½ out of 5 stars, considering that, "leaving prejudices aside, laughs and surprises abound, as well as film references".

Raquel Hernández Luján of HobbyConsolas scored 55 out of 100 points ("so-so"), assessing that, insofar the film aims towards parodying the genre of teenage vampire sagas in an effort to entertain, it is successful at times, although the humor leaves much to be desired.

Accolades 

|-
| rowspan = "4" align = "center" | 2022 || rowspan = "4" | 5th Berlanga Awards || Best Supporting Actor || Ferran Gadea ||  || rowspan = "4" | 
|-
| Best Art Direction || Rafa Jannone || 
|-
| Best Sound || José Manuel Sospedra || 
|-
| Best Makeup and Hairstyles ||  Esther Guillem y Ana Guillem ||  
|}

See also 
 List of Spanish films of 2022

References 

Films shot in the province of Valencia
Films shot in Valencia
Spanish romantic comedy films
Spanish comedy horror films
Spanish vampire films
2022 romantic comedy films
2020s comedy horror films
2020s teen comedy films
Vampire comedy films
2020s Spanish-language films
2020s Spanish films
Filmax films